Grevillea caleyi, also known as Caley's grevillea, is a species of flowering plant in the family Proteaceae and is endemic to a restricted area of New South Wales. It is an open, spreading shrub with deeply divided leaves with linear lobes, and fawn flowers with a maroon to red style.

Description

Taxonomy
Grevillea caleyi was first formally described in 1830 by Robert Brown in Supplementum primum prodromi florae Novae Hollandiae from specimens collected in 1805, near Port Jackson by George Caley. The species has the common name Caley's grevillea.

Distribution and habitat
Caley's grevillea grows in woodland on sandstone ridgetops in the Terrey Hills-Belrose area in the north of Sydney.

Conservation status
This grevillea is listed as "critically endangered" under the Australian Government Environment Protection and Biodiversity Conservation Act 1999 and the New South Wales Government Biodiversity Conservation Act 2016. The main threats to the species include habitat loss and fragmentation, inappropriate fire regimes, recreation activities and rubbish dumping.

References

caleyi
Flora of New South Wales
Proteales of Australia